Franklin station is a CTrain light rail station in Calgary, Alberta, Canada. It serves the Northeast Line (Route 202) and opened on April 27, 1985, as part of the original route.

The station is located in the median of Memorial Drive, just west of the intersection with 28 Street SE. The station is 4.7 km (2.92 mi) from the City Hall Interlocking. Pedestrian bridges connect the station to either side of Memorial Drive. Stairs, escalators, as well as an elevator provide access down to the center-loading platform.  The station serves (Albert Park/Radisson Heights) to the south and industrial areas to the north. 578 parking spaces are available for commuters.

As part of Calgary Transit's plan to operate 4-car trains by the end of 2014, all 3-car platforms are being extended. Franklin station also had new furnishings installed, in addition to a platform extension. Construction was completed in the late Summer/Fall of 2013.

In 2005, the station registered an average transit of 4,700 boardings per weekday.

References

CTrain stations
Railway stations in Canada opened in 1985